{{DISPLAYTITLE:C9H12FN}}
The molecular formula C9H12FN (molar mass: 153.197 g/mol) may refer to:

 2-Fluoroamphetamine (2-FA)
 3-Fluoroamphetamine (3-FA)
 4-Fluoroamphetamine (PFA)

Molecular formulas